Mark Asbock (born 7 April 1977) is an Australian former professional rugby league footballer who played for the Canberra Raiders in the National Rugby League.

Asbock, who comes from Queanbeyan, made three-first grade appearances for Canberra late in the 2002 NRL season. A winger, he scored a try in each of his first two games, against North Queensland and the Warriors.

Early in his career he played in France, which is where he met his wife Angelique.

References

External links
Mark Asbock at Rugby League project

1977 births
Living people
Australian rugby league players
Villefranche XIII Aveyron players
Canberra Raiders players
Rugby league players from Queanbeyan
Rugby league wingers